Kunihiro (written: 邦弘, 邦博, 邦宏, 邦洋, 邦広, 国宏, 訓広 or 九仁広) is a masculine Japanese given name. Notable people with the name include:

, Japanese animator
, Japanese film director
, Japanese swimmer
, Japanese voice actor
, Japanese comedian
, Japanese boxer
, Japanese footballer
, Japanese volleyball player
, Japanese footballer

Japanese masculine given names